Cyrtodactylus surin is a species of gecko that is endemic to the Surin Islands in Thailand.

References 

Cyrtodactylus
Reptiles described in 2011